Captain Kishori is a Bollywood film. It was released in 1940. The film starred Lalita Pawar, Nazir, Yasmin and Agha. It was directed by K. Amarnath for Mohan Pictures and the music was composed by Ram Gopal Pande.

References

External links
 

1940 films
1940s Hindi-language films
Indian black-and-white films
Indian action comedy films
1940s action comedy films